Röbäck is a locality situated in Umeå Municipality, Västerbotten County, Sweden with 2,230 inhabitants in 2010.

References

External links

Röbäck at Umeå Municipality

Populated places in Umeå Municipality